A lord paramount is a term of art in feudal law describing an overlord who holds his own fief from no superior lord. It thus describes a person who holds allodial title, owing no socage or feudal obligations such as military service. This was distinguished from a mesne lord who held his own fief from a superior.

Name
This latter term, however, was confused by later lawyers with "avail" in its senses of help, assistance, and profit and was eventually applied only to the actual occupiers or tenants who worked the land themselves. The vassal of a lord paramount, meanwhile, was a tenant-in-chief.

Instances
Generally speaking, under English law after the 1066 Norman Conquest, only the sovereignthe king or queenwas truly lord paramount in its larger sense. All other legal title to land was held through them, particularly after the abolition of most unusual feudal titles and obligations under the 1660 Statute of Tenures. The only major exceptioncontinuing to the present dayis the protection of the privileges of the duke of Cornwall as lord paramount over Cornish lands. A similar situation exists regarding the Duchy of Lancaster but is purely notional, the duchy being held in permanent personal union with the Crown.

Nonetheless, the term does appear in some other contexts. The marquess of Exeter holds the title of hereditory Lord Paramount of Peterborough. The peculiar way in which the baron holding the Lordship of Bowland oversaw himselfsome of his estates notionally owing service to othershas also been described in terms of paramouncy and obligation. (The situation was rendered still more academic when it was subsumed first into the Earldom of Lancaster in 1311 and then into the Duchy of Lancaster as an estate held by the Crown in 1351, which gave rise to the title of "Lord King of Bowland".) The title is also sometimes broadly applied to any overlord.

The concept continued to be invoked in other common law jurisdictions, including New York in the 1852 case of De Peyster v. Michael and Australia in the 1992 case of Mabo v Queensland. In the latter case, the High Court affirmed that Elizabeth II was lord paramount over all formal land tenure in Australia while simultaneously establishing the concept of a native title over areas not explicitly legally held by others and continuously occupied by aboriginal people.

See also
 Sovereignty & Allodial title
 Escheat
 Overlord & Mesne lord
 Feudalism & Seignory
 Quia Emptores & the Tenures Abolition Act 1660
 Native title in Australia

Notes

References

Citations

Bibliography
 
 .

Common law legal terminology
Feudalism in England
Land tenure
Lords of the Manor
Monarchy
Noble titles
Titles in the United Kingdom